János Nagy may refer to:
 János Nagy (diplomat) (born 1928), Hungarian diplomat and politician
 János Nagy (footballer) (born 1992), Hungarian footballer
 János Nagy (wrestler)
 János Nagy (boxer)